Atsimo-Atsinanana (South East) is a region in Madagascar. Its capital is Farafangana. The region used to be part of the Fianarantsoa Province.

The region extends along the southern part of the east coast of Madagascar. It is bordered by Fitovinany and Haute Matsiatra (North), Ihorombe (West) and Anosy (South).

The population was 1,026,674 in 2018. It is among the poorest regions in the country, with a poverty rate of 83.9% according to a 2005 government report.

Administrative divisions
Atsimo-Atsinanana Region is divided into five districts, which are sub-divided into 90 communes.

 Befotaka Sud District - 6 communes
 Farafangana District - 30 communes
 Midongy-Atsimo District - 6 communes
 Vangaindrano District - 28 communes
 Vondrozo District - 16 communes

Transport

Airports
Farafangana Airport
Vangaindrano Airport

Roads
 National Road RN 12 to Farafangana in the North. 
 National Road 12a to Fort Dauphin  (South).
 RN T18 unpaved track to Nosifeno and the Midongy du sud National Park.

Rivers
 Manampatrana River - (mouth near Farafangana)
 Mananara River - ( mouth near Vangaindrano)
 Masianaka river - (mouth near Masianaka)
 Mamandro river (southern border to Anosy, mouth at Manambondro

Protected Areas
 Part of Fandriana-Vondrozo Corridor
Agnakatrika New Protected Area
Agnalazaha New Protected Area
Ankarabolava New Protected Area
 Midongy Atsimo National Park
 Manombo Reserve

Economy

Mining
 Ankaizina mine
 Farafangana mine
 Green Giant mine

References

 
Regions of Madagascar